Club de Fútbol Illueca is a Spanish football team based in Illueca, in the autonomous community of Aragon. Founded in 1935, it plays in Tercera División – Group 17, holding home matches at Estadio Papa Luna.

Season to season

17 seasons in Tercera División

References

External links
ArefePedia team profile 
Soccerway team profile

Football clubs in Aragon
Association football clubs established in 1935
1935 establishments in Spain